The Bayer designations d Carinae and D Carinae are distinct.

for d Carinae, see V343 Carinae
for D Carinae, see HR 3159

Carinae, d
Carina (constellation)